Aiouea macedoana is a species of plant in the family Lauraceae. It is endemic to Brazil.

References

macedoana
Flora of Brazil
Vulnerable plants
Taxonomy articles created by Polbot